Aphelia insincera is a species of moth of the family Tortricidae. It is found in Asia Minor.

References

Aphelia (moth)
Moths described in 1912
Moths of Asia
Taxa named by Edward Meyrick